Ades Kari-ye Olya (also Romanized as ‘Ades Kārī-ye ‘Olyā) is a village in Jowzar Rural District, in the Central District of Mamasani County, Fars Province, Iran. At the 2006 census, its population was 25, in 5 families.

References 

Populated places in Mamasani County